The National Citizens Alliance was a minor federal political party in Canada, registered with Elections Canada from 2014 to 2017 and from 2019 to 2023. It was founded and led by perennial candidate Stephen Garvey, a proponent of far-right conspiracy theories. The party had been described by critics as alt-right, white nationalist, and Islamophobic.

History 
In August 2015, the party was registered under the party name, Democratic Advancement Party of Canada (DAPC). The party, under the DAPC name, fielded four candidates in the 2015 federal election. In January 2017, the party name was changed to National Advancement Party of Canada (NAPC). Garvey was a candidate in Calgary Skyview, receiving 1.5% of the vote, Fahed Khalid was a candidate in Bow River where he won 0.17% of the vote, Max Veress received 0.33% of the vote in Calgary Forest Lawn, and Faizan Butt received 0.34% of the vote in Calgary Nose Hill. No candidate was elected.

The NAPC fielded two candidates in by-elections for the Calgary ridings in April 2017: Garvey was the candidate in Calgary Heritage (79 votes, 0.3%), and Kulbir Singh Chawla was the candidate in Calgary Midnapore (81 votes, 0.3%).

On December 13, 2017 the NAPC voluntarily deregistered itself from Elections Canada effective December 31, 2017. However, the party was revived as the National Citizens Alliance (NCA) and its registration with Elections Canada was confirmed in January 2019.

The party ran four candidates in the 2019 federal election and received 510 votes overall.

The NCA submitted a request to the Chief Electoral Officer of Canada to voluntary deregister on February 24, 2023. The request was accepted and the party was deregistered four days later on February 28.

Policy and views 
The NCA has been described by critics as far-right, alt-right, white nationalist, anti-immigration, and Islamophobic. The party, however, claims that it is "neither left nor right" and adopts policies from both sides of the political spectrum.

Nationalism 
The NCA describes itself as "nationalist, pro-Canadian and anti-globalist". The party's platform proposes amending the Canadian Charter of Rights and Freedoms to include the preservation of "European-Canadian heritage". The party also supports the preservation of Quebecois culture, but opposes Quebec independence, instead advocating for greater cooperation between the federal government and Quebec. The party opposes multiculturalism in Canada and wants to repeal the Canadian Multiculturalism Act. They are particularly opposed to the idea of a post-national state.

Immigration 
The NCA proposes limiting the immigration rate, which they believe to be too high for proper screening and vetting, as well as restricting or halting immigration from nations with "strong terrorist activities", or that supposedly do not share what the party describes as "Canadian values". The party also advocates for the deportation of all illegal immigrants who entered Canada through the United States as part of a Safe Third Country Agreement loophole.

Rights 
The NCA proposes a ban on abortions after three months of pregnancy. The party advocates the prohibition of "schools and any other relevant organizations / institutions from exposing children to indoctrination [on] sexual identity". The party supports gun rights and describes the current gun regulations in Canada as excessive and ineffective.

The party proposes increasing penalties for animal cruelty, and implementing a full ban on bestiality, which is currently only partly banned in Canada.

Conspiracy theories 
The leader of the NCA, Stephen Garvey, is known for his support of several far-right conspiracy theories, and in turn the party's policies have also reflected such beliefs.

Politics and society 
The NCA supports the "Great Replacement" conspiracy theory and states that there is a plot between "globalists" and "cultural Marxists" to replace the white population of Canada with "Third World immigrants". Muslims and Sikhs in particular are often targets of the party's anti-immigration rhetoric.

In early 2021, the NCA released a statement denouncing its coverage on Wikipedia, claiming that "communists and Marxists" had been paid by mainstream media to spread misinformation about the party on the website.

Science and technology 
The NCA supports the chemtrail conspiracy theory and asserts that the chemicals released are used to deflect sunlight. The party also supports the conspiracy theory that exposure to 5G radio waves leads to adverse health effects and 5G technology is being used for mass surveillance on behalf of the government. The party does not accept the scientific consensus on climate change and dismisses it as "globalist alarmism".

Leader 
Stephen Garvey is a former associate of the anti-immigration group Worldwide Coalition Against Islam (WCAI), until publicly cutting ties with the group in June 2017. He was the lead organizer of a March 2017 protest in Calgary against Motion 103 (M-103), a non-binding resolution in the federal House of Commons which condemned Islamophobia and all other forms of systemic racism and religious discrimination.

Garvey believes in the "Great Replacement" conspiracy theory and has claimed that there is a deliberate plot to demographically replace whites in Canada. He also dismisses the existence of Islamophobia as "complete nonsense... created in the 1990s by the Muslim Brotherhood for the sole reason to silence criticism on Islam."

In May 2017, Garvey was the spokesperson for a protest in Red Deer which alleged that Syrian students at Lindsay Thurber Comprehensive High School were given more lenient punishments for participating in a fight than other students. The allegations were false, as school officials and local RCMP confirmed all eight students involved were suspended for one week.

In June 2017, the NAPC held an impromptu press conference in protest against the City of Calgary for revoking the special event permit for the party's "Say No to Hate and Racism Festival", which the City viewed as "anti-Muslim and Islamophobic" and other observers characterized as "anti-Islam". Garvey, former candidate Kulbir Singh Chawla and several other National Advancement supporters were interrupted later that month at another press conference by marchers from the anti-fascist group Calgary Antifa.

In August 2019, Garvey was charged with offences under the Criminal Code and Canada Elections Act for providing false information to the Chief Electoral Officer and circumventing election contribution limits.

A man, later identified as Garvey, was captured on video questioning Ontario MPP Gurratan Singh at MuslimFest in September 2019 and demanding to know if Singh supported "political Islam". Garvey was shown being escorted out of the event by security in the video. Singh classified the encounter as racist and other politicians, including Justin Trudeau and Andrew Scheer, released statements condemning racism and discrimination in response to the video.

Election results

Notes

References

External links 
 
 National Advancement Party of Canada  – Canadian Political Parties and Political Interest Groups — web archive created by the University of Toronto Libraries

2014 establishments in Alberta
Alt-right organizations
Anti-Islam political parties
Anti-globalization political parties
Climate change denial
Far-right politics in Canada
Nationalist parties in Canada
Anti-Islam sentiment in Canada
Organizations based in Calgary
Political parties established in 2014
Populist parties
Right-wing populism in Canada
Right-wing populist parties
White nationalism in Canada
White nationalist parties